This is a list of estates of nobility in the county of Derbyshire in England. It includes current and former family seats of the Peerage of England. The list is ordered by rank of the English peerage in descending order: Duke, Marquess, Earl, Viscount, Baron and Baronet.

Noble family estates in Derbyshire

See also 

 Lost houses of Derbyshire

References 

Derbyshire-related lists
History of Derbyshire
Country houses in Derbyshire